Long-chain fatty acid transport protein 6 is a protein that in humans is encoded by the SLC27A6 gene.

This gene encodes a member of the fatty acid transport protein family (FATP). FATPs are involved in the uptake of long-chain fatty acids and have unique expression patterns. Alternatively spliced transcript variants encoding the same protein have been found for this gene.

See also 
 Solute carrier family

References

Further reading

Solute carrier family